Discoverer 22, also known as Corona 9015, was an American optical reconnaissance satellite which was lost in a launch failure in 1961. It was the fourth of ten Corona KH-2 satellites, based on the Agena-B.

The launch of Discoverer 22 occurred at 20:34:43 UTC on 30 March 1961. A Thor DM-21 Agena-B rocket was used, flying from launch pad 75-3-4 at the Vandenberg Air Force Base. Due to a malfunction of the rocket's second stage, it failed to achieve orbit.

Discoverer 22 was to have operated in a low Earth orbit. Images were to have been recorded onto  film, and returned in a Satellite Recovery Vehicle. The Satellite Recovery Vehicle carried aboard Discoverer 22 was SRV-509.

References

Spacecraft launched in 1961
Satellite launch failures